Louis Boekhout (1 March 1919 in Netherlands – 9 January 2012 in Canada)  was a painter born in the Netherlands who later immigrated to Québec Canada.

Biography
Born to Theodoor Boekhout et de Anna Maria Heijs, in Bergen-op-Zoom, raised for the most part in Indonesia, Boekhout began his training at the Royal Academy of Fine Arts in Antwerp at the age of 19 where he studied under Floris de Cuyper and later perfected his training in France.

The onset of World War II forced Boekhout to momentarily put his painting career on hold. After the War, he immigrated to Québec, where he became acquainted with Marc-Aurèle Fortin (1888–1970). He finally settled in Chénéville, Quebec circa 1970 where he bought a small cottage. The surroundings and peacefulness of the country were an endless source of inspiration. He also taught painting classes and gave French lessons.  He had a talent for finding water and was a well-known healer.

Work
Boekhout body of work includes oils and water color paintings. His art lies somewhere in between the Dutch School, the  Barbizon school  and Impressionism. He enjoyed painting outdoors where his inspiration was his surroundings; and indoors where his inspiration was memory tempered by his imagination. He never painted from photographs or from illustrations. His philosophy and spirituality transcended his work and gives it a peculiar lightness. Boekhout was also a master at detecting colors and nuances in his surroundings and rendered these in his art.

Boekhout spent many years teaching at the Presentation High School, a residential school for problem youngsters, in Montebello, Quebec.

Collections
Boekhout's art work can be found in public collections like at the Musée national des beaux-arts du Québec, as well as in private collections worldwide such as Collection Le Portal Art Tour, and even at the White House.

References

External links

 Collection Le Portal Art Tour 
 Québec National Library - Louis Boekhout Exhibition Catalogue 2003
 
 
 LeDroit - Ottawa - Daily Newspaper - Article on death of Louis Boekhout

1919 births
2012 deaths
Canadian landscape painters
Artists from Quebec
Dutch emigrants to Canada
Dutch landscape painters
People from Bergen op Zoom
Royal Academy of Fine Arts (Antwerp) alumni